The valley and ridge salamander (Plethodon hoffmani) is a species of salamander in the family Plethodontidae endemic to the Appalachian Mountains in the eastern United States.

Etymology
The species is named after biologist Richard Hoffman of Virginia, who collected the holotype specimen in 1954.

Description
This species is slender with short legs, a long tail, and 21 costal grooves. The dorsum is dark brown to blackish with scattered whitish or brassy flecks and the venter is dark with mottling, especially on the chin.

Distribution
This species can be found in the Appalachians from the Susquehanna River Valley in Pennsylvania, south to the New River in northwestern Virginia, eastern West Virginia, and western Maryland.

Ecology
The species occurs in terrestrial valley and ridge physiography, generally in mature hardwood forests with well-drained soils. It lays eggs in moist cavities, where they develop directly without a larval stage. Individuals can be found under logs and rocks and tolerate cool weather well. In wet weather, they forage in leaf litter and as the surface dries, retreat to damp covered areas. They tend to be found on slightly drier slopes than their close relative, the red-backed salamander.

References

Plethodon
Salamander, Valley and Ridge
Ecology of the Appalachian Mountains
Salamander, Valley and Ridge
Fauna of the Northeastern United States
Fauna of the Southeastern United States
Taxonomy articles created by Polbot
Amphibians described in 1971